The Self-Sufficiency Project was a  Canadian experiment in the 1990s that provided a "generous, time-limited earnings supplement available to single parents who had been on welfare for a least a year, and who subsequently left welfare and found full-time work."

The study found that individuals offered a SSP subsidy were four percent more likely to stay on welfare to receive the benefit, but once people qualified for the SSP supplement, 44% left welfare dependence and were employed full-time—defined as working at least 30 hours a week.  The program was interesting since increases in employment boosted payroll and other taxes to a large enough extent that the subsidy paid for itself.

Studies

Berkeley's David Card has studied this extensively with several papers, revealing the aforementioned results.

See also 
 Welfare reform
 Welfare state

International:
 Personal Responsibility and Work Opportunity Act

References

Welfare in Canada
Welfare reform
Social security in Canada